The 2005 European Youth Summer Olympic Festival was held in Lignano Sabbiadoro, Italy.

Sports

Venues

Calendar

Mascot
The mascot for the 2005 European Youth Olympic Festival is Coki, a seagull.

Participating nations

Medal table

References

External links
Official website

 
2005
European Youth Summer Olympic Festival
European Youth Summer Olympic Festival
European Youth Summer Olympic Festival
Multi-sport events in Italy
Sport in Udine
Youth sport in Italy
2005 in youth sport
July 2005 sports events in Europe